Anna Harris Goodman is an American songwriter who was married to Ben Folds from 1987 to 1992. She was best friends with Ben since they were school children, and encouraged him to play piano at a young age. She was the manager of his band Majosha in the late 1980s and early 1990s. They were married at a young age in their early 20s, and often collaborated together on songwriting. She co-wrote several Ben Folds Five songs including:

 "Alice Childress" (Ben Folds Five)
 "The Last Polka" (Ben Folds Five)
 "Kate" (Whatever and Ever Amen)
 "Smoke" (Whatever and Ever Amen)
 "Lullabye" (The Unauthorized Biography of Reinhold Messner)

Anna was also a long-time member of Sin-é Cafe's resident band Porkchop, which was composed of Beavis and Butt-head directors and producers, Mike deSeve and Brian Mulroney; Ryan Adams guitarist J. P. Bowersock; Dale Burleyson; Gaijin a Go-Go's Phil Maynes; Brad Brown and Chris LaFrenz.

References 

Year of birth missing (living people)
Living people
American women songwriters
21st-century American women